John James Terris  (born 19 June 1939) is a New Zealand politician, priest and broadcaster who represented the Labour Party in the New Zealand parliament.

Biography

Early life and career
Terris was born in Wanganui in 1939 to Alexander Roderick Terris and his wife Rosa Maria (née Donovan) and attended New Plymouth Boys' High School. Terris also attended St John's Theological College and attained a diploma. In 1970 he was ordained by the Anglican Church as a Worker Priest. He was a member Lower Hutt Family Centre Trust and a convenor of the Hutt Youth Drop-In Centre Management Committee.

He became active in broadcasting on both radio and television. He had been employed at various stages as an announcer, interviewer, and executive producer. He was also a trade unionist and was employed at the Public Service Association as a senior advocate.

Member of Parliament

He became involved in the Labour Party and became chairman of the  Labour Electorate Committee. In 1977 Terris was elected a member of the Lower Hutt City Council on the Labour Party ticket His wife was initially supposed to stand but after she had to withdraw her candidacy he filled her slot on the ticket. He served as the chairman of the councils Management Resources committee and a member of the Dowse Art Gallery and Museum management committee. He was the only Labour member re-elcected to the council in 1980 and "topped the poll" in 1983 with more votes than any other candidate. Consequently he was nominated for the position of deputy mayor. He lost in a ballot among fellow councillors to Teri Puketapu of the United Citizens ticket (which held the majority on the council). In 1989 he retired from the city council.

In 1979 he was appointed as Labour's spokesperson for Broadcasting. In 1981 he was additionally appointed as spokesperson on Internal Affairs. As opposition spokesperson on broadcasting he aroused the ire of the Left (chiefly Jim Anderton and Fran Wilde) by saying that there should also be a private channel, and was accused of "political incorrectness". So he was then given "Internal Affairs", a shadow portfolio generally reserved for "caucus down-and-outs".

In 1984 he was not selected for Cabinet but was given the "consolation prize" of Deputy Speaker (hence also Acting Speaker), and Chairman of Committees of the House of Representatives from 1984 to 1990. In May 1990 Terris submitted a private members bill to force a binding referendum on the electoral system. His bill was defeated but a referendum eventually occurred in 1992.

In January 1986, Terris was convicted of drink-driving, something he told The Evening Post was "not a sensible thing to do".

Terris represented the Western Hutt electorate until 1990, when he was defeated by National's Joy McLauchlan, one of a number of losses contributing to the fall of the Fourth Labour Government. After losing his seat in Parliament he shifted to Wanganui to fill the post of vicar at St Peter's Anglican parish. He also returned to broadcasting and was a talkback host for Radio Liberty. When Mike Moore was dumped as Labour Party leader in 1993 for Helen Clark he left the party feeling disaffected with its direction. He was briefly involved with establishing ACT New Zealand, a new party headed by former Labour MP Roger Douglas, but soon left the party.

Mayor of Lower Hutt
In March 1995 Terris resigned his post with the church in Wanganui and returned to Lower Hutt. He stood for Mayor of Lower Hutt at the 1995 local elections and was successful. He is the only person ever to have been both MP and mayor in the Hutt Valley (another mayor Thomas William McDonald was an MP, but was MP for the  electorate outside the Hutt Valley). He served as mayor until 2004 when he was defeated by former councillor David Ogden. His re-election campaign suffered greatly when was hospitalised with blood poisoning at the start of the election leaving him little time or energy to campaign.

Outside politics
An ordained Anglican priest, Terris spent his early working life in radio and television.

, Terris serves as the President of Media Matters in NZ, an advocacy group which campaigns against what it regards as gratuitous sex and violence in the electronic media. He published his autobiography Being Who You Are in 2004.

In 2013 he published a handbook on How To Make a Speech and How To Run A Meeting. His latest book, released in July 2014 and called September Showdown is a light-hearted look at the perils of a parliamentary career. He has an interest in heritage issues and regularly contributes to the Radio New Zealand programme Sounds Historical.  Terris has also produced a series of six video documentaries on local subjects called Village to City, as well as a series of six interviews with local Hutt people who lived through World War II, both of which he has donated to the Hutt City Libraries.

In the 1990 New Year Honours, Terris was appointed a Companion of the Queen's Service Order for public services, and in 1990 he was also awarded the New Zealand 1990 Commemoration Medal. He became a Rotary Paul Harris Fellow in 2005.

Notes

References

|-

|-

1939 births
Living people
People educated at New Plymouth Boys' High School
People educated at St John's College, Auckland
New Zealand Labour Party MPs
Members of the New Zealand House of Representatives
New Zealand MPs for Hutt Valley electorates
Mayors of Lower Hutt
New Zealand radio presenters
New Zealand Anglican priests
Unsuccessful candidates in the 1990 New Zealand general election
Wellington regional councillors
Hutt City Councillors
Companions of the Queen's Service Order